Not Everybody Lives the Same Way is a novel by the French writer Jean-Paul Dubois, published in 2019. An English translation by David Homel was published in 2022 by MacLehose Press (UK) and The Overlook Press (US).

The novel received the 2019 Prix Goncourt.

Content 
The novel tells the story of Paul Hansen, who has been incarcerated for two years in the provincial Bordeaux Prison in Montreal, Quebec, Canada.

Reception 
On 4 November 2019, the novel received the Prix Goncourt. Dubois won in the second round of voting, with six votes against four for Belgian writer Amélie Nothomb's novel Soif. Philippe Claudel, one of the jurors of the prize, called the novel a masterpiece, "full of humanity, melancholy, irony." The Agence France-Presse news agency called it "an affecting and nostalgic novel of lost happiness." The French magazine L'Obs called it "basically perfect."

The novel was also awarded the Prix Ginkgo du Livre Audio, for the audio version read by Jacques Gamblin.

Awards
 2019 Prix Goncourt
 2020 Prix Ginkgo - Le Livre sur la Place - Ville de Nancy

See also
 2019 in literature
 Contemporary French literature

References

2019 French novels
French-language novels
Prix Goncourt winning works
Novels set in Canada
Novels set in Montreal
Novels set in prison
Novels set in the 20th century
Novels set in the 21st century
MacLehose Press books
The Overlook Press books